Jerolim Kavanjin (Italian: Girolamo Cavagnini) (4 February 1641 – 29 November 1714) was a Croatian language poet from Split then in Republic of Venice, today in Croatia.

He was born into a wealthy and noble family of Split, as a descendant of Croaticised Italian family of Cavagnini. Kavanjin rose to prominence at the same time as Ignjat Đurđević: at the beginning of the 18th century. He was married to the sister of John Peter Marchi. In 1703 Kavanjin became a member of the Illyrian Academy Marchi founded in 1703.

In his summer mansion on Sutivan, on the island of Brač, where he retired after military and legislative career, Kavanjin wrote the most voluminas poetical work in the whole Croatian literature (approx. 32 500 verses): Poviest vanđelska bogatoga a nesretna Epuluna i ubogoga a čestita Lazara, usually referred to by the later editors, according to the subtitle in the original, as Bogatstvo i uboštvo. This religious-philosophical epic is poetically inconsistent but stylistically marked (it is written, beside Split Čakavian, in Ijekavian–Ikavian Štokavian).

Expressing the spirit of philosophical movements of the 17th and 18th centuries, this "encyclopædia in verses" (Josip Aranza) directs its Baroque spirituality towards the cogitation on life and human essentiality in the dual nature of the human and the divine.

Beside the classical humanistic, Latinate and Italian literatures (Dante), the Bible and other religious writings, and beside the historical authors (Constantine Porphyrogenitus, priest of Duklja, Mavro Orbini), writings of the Old Dubrovnik have constituted the basic Kavanjin's reading list, above others Junije Palmotić and Ivan Gundulić.

Kavanjin identified with Slavs and Dalmatia, and John Fine interprets his pan-Slavism and Dalmatianism close to have been an ethnic notion.

Kavanjin died in Split, aged 73.

References

Sources 
 
 

1641 births
1714 deaths
18th-century Croatian poets
People from Sutivan
Writers from Split, Croatia
Republic of Venice poets
Venetian Slavs
Illyrian Academy
Croatian male poets
18th-century male writers